Keep It Spotless is an American competition television program that aired on Nickelodeon from March 26, 2018 to November 20, 2018. The program is presented by Melissa van der Schyff.

Premise 
The program features children contestants competing for cash prizes as they aim to keep themselves clean while they navigate and make their way around an obstacle course, which contains various means to splatter the contestants with non-toxic paint in various colors. The contestants must avoid the paint as much as possible and are scored in percentiles, based on how little paint ends up on their all-white clothing (for instance, 30 points are scored if an after-game scan confirms the contestant was 30% 'spotless', or 70% covered with paint upon their clothes).

Episodes

Production 
The program is produced by ITV Entertainment and Hard Nocks South Productions and based on a UK format from ITV Studios-owned entertainment label Possessed and created by Simon Crossley titled Spotless. The program also takes inspiration from Nickelodeon classics, including Double Dare and You Can't Do That on Television.

Ratings 
 
}}

References 

2010s American children's game shows
2010s Nickelodeon original programming
2018 American television series debuts
2018 American television series endings
English-language television shows
Nickelodeon game shows
Television series by ITV Studios